The third cabinet of Ion I. C. Brătianu was the government of Romania from 4 January 1914 to 10 December 1916. During this period Romania entered World War I on the side of the Allied Powers.

Ministers
The ministers of the cabinet were as follows:

President of the Council of Ministers:
Ion I. C. Brătianu (4 January 1914 - 10 December 1916)
Minister of the Interior: 
Vasile G. Morțun (4 January 1914 - 10 December 1916)
Minister of Foreign Affairs: 
Emanoil Porumbaru (4 January 1914 - 8 December 1916)
Ion I. C. Brătianu (8 - 10 December 1916)
Minister of Finance:
Emil Costinescu (4 January 1914 - 10 December 1916)
Minister of Justice:
Victor Antonescu (4 January 1914 - 10 December 1916)
Minister of Religious Affairs and Public Instruction:
Ion Gh. Duca (4 January 1914 - 10 December 1916)
Minister of War:
Ion I. C. Brătianu (4 January 1914 - 15 August 1916)
Vintilă I. C. Brătianu (15 August - 10 December 1916)
Minister of Public Works:
Constantin Angelescu (4 January 1914 - 10 December 1916)
Minister of Industry and Commerce:
Alexandru Radovici (4 January 1914 - 10 December 1916)
Minister of Agriculture and Property:
Alexandru Constantinescu (4 January 1914 - 10 December 1916)

References

Cabinets of Romania
Cabinets established in 1914
Cabinets disestablished in 1916
1914 establishments in Romania
1916 disestablishments in Romania
Romania in World War I